The National Technological Initiative (NTI) is a 2014 program created by Vladimir Putin with the purpose of creating Russian global technical leadership in Russia. It is a $2.1 trillion  “road map” for development of the cybernetics market until 2035.

Programs
 AeroNet  pilotless aviation systems are widely used in agriculture, cargo transportation, and during search and rescue operations.  The new flying taxi is called SerVert SV5B created by Russia's aviation startup, Aviaton.
 AvtoNet long-haul ground transportation using robotized road corridors
 MariNet   digital navigation, pilotless sea vessels, and exploration of  ocean resources. 
 NeuroNet men will communicative with machines by neural interface.

 Other goals
 Developing a Russian computer programming language, secure cybernetic communications, quantum computing, and teleportation.
 5G mobile network in a number of Russian regions and allow data transfers of up to one gigabit per second.

See also
 Skolkovo Innovation Center
 Skolkovo Moscow School of Management
 Skolkovo, Moscow Oblast - Russian Silicon Valley project location

Notes

External links
 National Technological Initiative official site

Cybernetics